This is an incomplete list of caves in the United Kingdom, including information on the largest and deepest caves in the UK.

Longest, deepest and largest
It includes the Ease Gill system, the Notts Pot / Ireby Fell Cavern system, the Lost John's Cave system, and the Pippikin Pot system, all of which are connected.

This makes it the largest known cave chamber in the United Kingdom.

England 
By English caving region.

Devon
See also Caves in Devon

Ash Hole Cavern
Bakers Pit, Buckfastleigh
Chudleigh Cavern
 Kent's Cavern
 Kitley Show Cave
 Pridhamsleigh Cavern, Ashburton
 Reed's Cave

Mendip Hills
The following are all within Somerset unless otherwise stated. See also Caves of the Mendip Hills.

 Aveline's Hole
 Charterhouse Cave
 Cox's cave
 Eastwater Cavern
 GB Cave
 Goatchurch Cavern
 Gough's Cave
 Lamb Leer
 Longwood Swallet
 Manor Farm Swallet
 Pierre's Pot
 Reservoir Hole
 Rhino Rift
 Shatter Cave
 St Cuthbert's Swallet
 Stoke Lane Slocker
 Swildon's Hole
 Thrupe Lane Swallet
 Wookey Hole Caves

Peak District
The following are all within Derbyshire unless otherwise stated. See also List of caves in the Peak District and List of caves in Derbyshire.
 Blue John Cavern
 Great Masson Cavern
 Great Rutland Cavern
 Oxlow Cavern
 Peak Cavern
 Poole's Cavern
 Speedwell Cavern
 Thor's Cave, Staffordshire
 Titan
 Treak Cliff Cavern

Yorkshire Dales
 Alum Pot
 Aquamole Pot
 Bar Pot, Gaping Gill
 Boxhead Pot
 Big Meanie (See Death's Head Hole)
 The Buttertubs
 Crackpot Cave
 Coal Hole Entrance (See Short Drop Cave)
 Death's Head Hole
 Disappointment Pot, Gaping Gill
 Ease Gill Caverns
 Eden Sike Cave, Mallerstang
 Flood Entrance Pot, Gaping Gill
 Gaping Gill
 Gavel Pot
 Great Douk Cave
 Goyden Pot
 Great Douk Cave
 Ingleborough Cave
 It's a Cracker (See Lost Pot)
 Jib Tunnel
 Jingling Caves (See Jingling Pot)
 Jingling Pot
 Juniper Gulf
 Langcliffe Pot
 Long Churn Caves
 Lost John's Cave
 Long Drop Cave
 Long Kin East Cave
 Lost Pot
 Manchester Hole
 Marilyn, Gaping Gill (See Disappointment Pot)
 Mossdale Caverns
 Motley Pot, Gaping Gill (See Disappointment Pot)
 New Goyden Pot
 OBJ Pot, Gaping Gill (See Flood Entrance Pot)
 Oddmire Pot (See Langcliffe Pot)
 Rat Hole, Gaping Gill
 Rat Hole Sink, Gaping Gill (See Rat Hole)
 Rift Pot (see Long Kin East Cave)
 Rift Entrance (See Short Drop Cave)
 Rowten Pot
 Rumbling Beck Cave (See Rumbling Hole)
 Rumbling Hole
 Short Long Drop Cave (see Long Drop Cave)
 Simpson Pot
 Short Drop Cave
 Skirwith Cave
 Small Mammal Pot, Gaping Gill (See Bar Pot)
 Stile Pot, Gaping Gill (See Bar Pot)
 Stream Passage Pot, Gaping Gill
 Stump Cross Caverns
 Swinsto Cave
 Three Counties System
 Wades Entrance, Gaping Gill (See Flood Entrance Pot)
 Weathercote Cave
 White Scar Caves
 Yordas Cave
 Yordas Pot (See Yordas Cave)

Other areas
 Alloa Lea Quarry Cave, Northumberland
 Creswell Crags
 Excalibur Pot, North York Moors
 Kirkdale Cave, North York Moors
 Miss Grace's Lane, Forest of Dean, Gloucestershire 
 Mother Ludlam's Cave, Moor Park, Farnham, Surrey
 Dog Hole Cave, Cumbria
 Pate Hole, Cumbria
 Slaughter Stream Cave, Forest of Dean, Gloucestershire
 Heathery Burn Cave, Stanhope, County Durham
 Pen Park Hole, Bristol
 Clearwell Caves, Forest of Dean, Gloucestershire

Northern Ireland 
The following are all within County Fermanagh unless otherwise stated. See also Caves of the Tullybrack and Belmore hills. 
 Badger Pot
 Boho Caves
 Marble Arch Caves
 Noon's Hole
 Portbraddon Cave, County Antrim
 Shannon Cave, County Fermanagh and County Cavan, Republic of Ireland)

Scotland 

 Calder's Geo, Shetland
 Cleeves Cove Cave, North Ayrshire
 Fingal's Cave, Inner Hebrides
 Smoo Cave, Sutherland
 Uamh An Claonaite, Sutherland

Wales 

 Cathole Cave
 Dan yr Ogof
 Ogof Agen Allwedd
 Ogof Craig a Ffynnon
 Ogof Draenen
 Ogof Ffynnon Ddu
 Ogof Hen Ffynhonnau
 Ogof Hesp Alyn
 Ogof Llyn Parc
 Ogof Nadolig
 Ogof y Daren Cilau
 Otter Hole
 Porth yr Ogof

See also
Caving in the United Kingdom
Geography of the United Kingdom
 List of caves
List of UK caving fatalities
 Speleology

References

External links 
 UK Caves

 
United Kingdom
Caves